Protein LMBR1L is a protein that in humans is encoded by the LMBR1L gene.

References

Further reading